Celaenorrhinus rubeho is a species of butterfly in the family Hesperiidae. It is found in eastern Tanzania. The habitat consists of forests at altitudes between 1,900 and 2,000 meters.

The length of the forewings is 20.2 mm for males. The female of this species is unknown.

References

Endemic fauna of Tanzania
Butterflies described in 1990
rubeho